Esenler is a district of Istanbul, Turkey, on its European side. Esenler is mainly densely packed, working class residential in the midst of its industrial neighbouring districts of  Gaziosmanpaşa, Güngören and Bağcılar. The mayor is Tevfik Göksu.

History
In the Ottoman times this area, well outside the city walls, was the villages of Litros and Avas, populated by Greek farmers. During the 1923 population exchange between Greece and Turkey, these villagers were deported and the area was then settled by Turks who had themselves been deported from Macedonia. Christian Orthodox Romani people from Esenler settled in Amaliada four decades after population exchange. It was part of Bakırköy district till 1992 and Güngören between 1992 and 1994.

Esenler today
Many of the large numbers of people that migrated to Istanbul in the 60s to 90s ended up in districts like this and with a population of over half a million Esenler has desperately insufficient infrastructure, leading to over-crowded schoolrooms and many other problems.

Esenler has the largest inter-city bus terminal of the European side.

References

External links
 District governor's official website 
 District municipality's official website 
 Local news website 

 
Populated places in Istanbul Province
Districts of Istanbul Province